The following is a list of the 23 cantons of the Eure department, in France, following the French canton reorganisation which came into effect in March 2015:

 Les Andelys
 Bernay
 Beuzeville
 Bourg-Achard
 Breteuil
 Brionne
 Conches-en-Ouche
 Évreux-1
 Évreux-2
 Évreux-3
 Gaillon
 Gisors
 Grand Bourgtheroulde
 Louviers
 Le Neubourg
 Pacy-sur-Eure
 Pont-Audemer
 Pont-de-l'Arche
 Romilly-sur-Andelle
 Saint-André-de-l'Eure
 Val-de-Reuil
 Verneuil d'Avre et d'Iton
 Vernon

The 43 cantons of the department before 2015 were:

References